Saeed Ahmed may refer to:

 Saeed Ahmed (footballer) (born 1990), Pakistani footballer
 Saeed Ahmed Abdulla (born 1994), Emirati footballer
 Saeed Ahmed (cricketer, born 1937), Pakistani Test cricketer
 Saeed Ahmad Khan (1900–1996), Pakistani Ahmadiyya Emir
 Saeed Ahmad Akhtar (1933–2013), Pakistani Urdu poet
 Saeed Ahmad Bodla, Pakistani artist
 Saeed Ahmad Palanpuri, Indian Islamic scholar

See also

 Ahmad (disambiguation)
 Ahmed
 Saeed
 Ahmed Saeed (disambiguation)